is a Japanese actress, voice actress, singer and essayist who voiced Lum in the anime series Urusei Yatsura. 

Fumi attended Tamagawa University in Machida, Tokyo where she graduated with a degree in Theatre from the Department of Fine Arts in the College of Humanities.

Filmography

Television animation
Anime Himitsu no Hanazono (Camilla)
Anime Sanjūshi (Milady)
Blue Comet SPT Layzner (Simone)
Blue Period (Masako Saeki)
Cat's Eye (Seira Nakamori)
Detective Conan (Rumi Wakasa)
Gate: Jieitai Kano Chi nite, Kaku Tatakaeri (Mimoza)
Kikōkai Garian (Hirumuka)
Infinite Stratos (Squall Meusel)
Kiratto Pri☆Chan (Martha Moegi)
Love Live! (Eli's grandmother)
Mission Outer Space Srungle (Sexy, Dolly)
Mobile Suit Gundam SEED (Aisha in Special Edition)
One Piece (Mother Carmel)
Pokémon (Drasna)
Platinum End (Muni)
Pro Golfer Saru (Benihachi)
Rin-ne (Sakura's mother)
Rumiko Takahashi Anthology (Kanna)
Stop!! Hibari-kun! (Tsugumi Ōzora)
Star Twinkle PreCure (Kaka)
The Kabocha Wine (Kaori Sawada)
Tokyo Ravens (Miyo Kurahashi)
Tsuritama (Kate)Urusei Yatsura (1981) (Lum)Urusei Yatsura (2022) (Lum's mom)

Theatrical animationThe Garden of Words (Takao's Mother)Magical Taruruuto-kunDetective Conan: The Private Eyes' Requiem (Reiko Shimizu)Urusei Yatsura series (Lum)Dareka no Manazashi (Narrator)

Original video animation (OVA)Ariel (Simone Trefan)Legend of the Galactic Heroes (Dominique Saint-Pierre)MD Geist (Vaiya in the Director's Cut)Outlanders (Kahm)Shōchū-hai Lemon Love 30s Ame ni Nurete moUrusei Yatsura (Lum)Is This a Zombie? (Eucliwood Hellscythe)

Video gamesInjustice: Gods Among Us (Catwoman)Tactics Ogre: Reborn (Deneb Rove)

Live actionThe Red Spectacles (1987) (Airport announcer)

DubbingBlue Jasmine, Ginger (Sally Hawkins)Blue Steel, Megan Turner (Jamie Lee Curtis)ER, Elaine Nichols (Rebecca De Mornay)Goodfellas, Karen Hill (Lorraine Bracco)Private School (1984 Fuji TV edition), Jordan Leigh-Jensen (Betsy Russell)Superman III'' (1985 TV Asahi edition), Lois Lane (Margot Kidder)

References

External links
 
Official agency profile 

1958 births
Living people
Anime singers
Aoni Production voice actors
Japanese child actresses
Japanese women singers
Japanese essayists
Japanese radio personalities
Japanese video game actresses
Japanese voice actresses
Japanese women essayists
Tamagawa University alumni
Voice actresses from Tokyo
20th-century Japanese women writers
21st-century Japanese women writers